The Cornwall Royals were a junior ice hockey team based in Cornwall, Ontario, Canada. The team played in the Quebec Major Junior Hockey League from 1969 to 1981, and the Ontario Hockey League from 1981 to 1992. This team shared its name with other Cornwall Royals teams that played in the QSHL, MMJHL, or OHA-B.

History

From 1961 until 1969, the Cornwall Royals were successful members of the Central Junior A Hockey League (CJHL). As perennial CJHL champions, they represented that league at the playdowns for the 1966, 1967 and 1968 Memorial Cup national junior hockey championships, falling in the quarterfinals each year against the representatives from Quebec. After an application to join the OHL was rejected, the franchise became one of the inaugural teams of the Quebec Major Junior Hockey League in 1969.  The Cornwall Royals were one of the league's premier teams during its tenure in the QMJHL, winning 3 Memorial Cup titles. For the 1981–82 season, the team transferred into the Ontario Hockey League.

The Royals suffered through many tough seasons and poor attendance after moving to the OHL. The switch in leagues alienated many die-hard fans from across the Quebec border. Seeking better fortunes, the franchise moved to Newmarket, Ontario to play as the Newmarket Royals in 1992. In 1994 the team was bought by the Ciccarelli brothers and moved to Sarnia, Ontario as the Sarnia Sting.

Championships
The Cornwall Royals are one of only 7 clubs to win consecutive Memorial Cup championships. They did so in 1980 and 1981. In total, the Royals won 3 Memorial Cups, 3 President's Cups, and 5 division titles while in the QMJHL. The Royals did not win any OHL championships.

CJHL Bogart Cup Championships: 1966, 1967, 1968

President's CupPlayoff Champions in the QMJHL.
1972 QMJHL Champions vs. Quebec Remparts
1980 QMJHL Champions vs. Sherbrooke Castors
1981 QMJHL Champions vs. Trois-Rivieres Draveurs

Jean Rougeau TrophyRegular season champions in the QMJHL.
1971–1972  96 points
1980–1981  90 points

West Division TrophyFirst overall in the West Division.
1973–1974  94 points

Lebel Division TrophyFirst overall in the Lebel Division.
1977–1978 100 points
1979–1980  88 points
1980–1981  90 points

Memorial Cups
 1972 CHL Champions vs. Peterborough Petes
 1980 CHL Champions vs. Peterborough Petes
 1981 CHL Champions vs. Kitchener Rangers

Coaches
Orval Tessier guided the Cornwall Royals to the Memorial Cup championship in 1972. Doug Carpenter coached the 1980 Royals, and Bob Kilger in 1981.

Marc Crawford was a former Cornwall Royals player who came back to coach. He would win the Stanley Cup coaching the Colorado Avalanche.  He also coached the Vancouver Canucks, the Los Angeles Kings, and the Dallas Stars.

List of Coaches
(Multiple years in parentheses)

1981–82 Bob Kilger
1982–83 Jocelyn Guevremont
1983–84 Jocelyn Guevremont / Floyd Crawford
1984–85 Floyd Crawford / Tony Zappia
1985–86 Tony Zappia
1986–89 Orval Tessier (3)
1989–91 Marc Crawford (2)
1991–92 John Lovell

*1982–83 coaches Bob Kilger, Bill Murphy, Gord Woods, Jocelyn Guevremont

Players
The Cornwall Royals graduated 55 players to the National Hockey League. From these alumni, 31 played for the Royals in the QMJHL, and 29 played for the Royals in the OHL, and 5 played for the Royals in both leagues.

CHL awards

CHL Player of the Year
1980–1981 Dale Hawerchuk

CHL Defenceman of the Year
1989–1990 John Slaney

CHL Scholastic Player of the Year
1991–1992 Nathan LaFayette

QMJHL awards

Michel Brière Commemorative Trophy(Most Valuable Player)
1973–74 Gary MacGregor
1974–75 Mario Viens
1980–81 Dale Hawerchuk

Guy Lafleur Trophy(Playoffs MVP)
1979–80 Dale Hawerchuk

Jean Béliveau Trophy(Top Scorer)
1980–81 Dale Hawerchuk

Instructors Trophy(Rookie of the Year)
1970–71 Bob Murphy
1971–72 Bob Murray
1979–80 Dale Hawerchuk

Emile Bouchard Trophy(Defenseman of the Year)
1980–81 Fred Boimistruck

Jacques Plante Commemorative Trophy(Best Goals Against Average)
1971–72 Richard Brodeur
1975–76 Tim Bernhardt
1976–77 Tim Bernhardt
1977–78 Tim Bernhardt

Mike Bossy Trophy(Best Professional Prospect)
1980–81 Dale Hawerchuk

Frank J. Selke Commemorative Trophy(Most Sportsmanlike Player)
1971–72 Gerry Teeple
1973–74 Gary MacGregor

OHL awards

Red Tilson TrophyOHL Most valuable player.
1982–1983 Doug Gilmour
1985–1986 Ray Sheppard

Eddie Powers Memorial TrophyOHL Top Point Scorer.
1982–1983 Doug Gilmour
1985–1986 Ray Sheppard

Jim Mahon Memorial TrophyOHL Top Scoring Right Winger.
1982–1983 Ian MacInnis
1985–1986 Ray Sheppard
1989–1990 Owen Nolan

Max Kaminsky TrophyMost Outstanding Defenceman.
1989–1990 John Slaney

OHL Goaltender of the YearVoted best goaltender in the OHL.
1987–1988 Rick Tabaracci

Emms Family AwardRookie of the year.
1988–1989 Owen Nolan

Bobby Smith TrophyScholastic player of the year.
1990–1991 Nathan LaFayette
1991–1992 Nathan LaFayette

Hockey Hall of Fame members
Three alumni of the Cornwall Royals have been enshrined in the Hockey Hall of Fame. The first was New York Islanders goalie Billy Smith. Smith was the inaugural goalie for the Royals in the QMJHL during the 1969–70 season. After that season he was drafted by the Los Angeles Kings, and won four consecutive Stanley Cups (1980–1983) with the Islanders. Dale Hawerchuk is the second inductee. He led the Royals to two Memorial Cup championships in 1980 and 1981. He was drafted first overall by the Winnipeg Jets in the 1981 NHL Entry Draft. The most recent inductee is Doug Gilmour. Gilmour was a big part of the back to back Memorial Cup Titles in '80 and '81, and later won a Stanley Cup with the Calgary Flames in 1989, scoring the Cup winning goal. He also captained the Toronto Maple Leafs from 1993 to 1997.

NHL alumni
Hockey Hall of Fame inductees in bold
QMJHL (1969–1981)

Jeff Allan
Dave Allison
Scott Arniel
Fred Arthur
Reid Bailey
Tim Bernhardt
Fred Boimistruck
Richard Brodeur
Eric Calder
Alain Chevrier
Bob Crawford
Lou Crawford
Marc Crawford
Dan Daoust
Jeff Eatough
Dan Frawley
Danny Geoffrion
Doug Gilmour
Dale Hawerchuk
Blair MacDonald
John Markell
Corrado Micalef
Bob Murray
Graeme Nicolson
Rick Paterson
Ron Scott
Al Sims
Billy Smith
Ron Smith
John Wensink
Rod Willard

OHL (1981–1992)

Scott Arniel
Bobby Babcock
Eric Calder
Jason Cirone
Larry Courville
Craig Duncanson
Jeff Eatough
Dan Frawley
Doug Gilmour
Jim Kyte
Nathan LaFayette
Alan Letang
Guy Leveque
Steve Maltais
Owen Nolan
Mike Prokopec
Rob Ray
Joe Reekie
Ken Sabourin
Mathieu Schneider
Ray Sheppard
John Slaney
Mike Stapleton
Jeremy Stevenson
Rick Tabaracci
Tom Thornbury
Mike Tomlak
Ryan Vandenbussche
Michael Ware

Season-by-season results

Regular season

Playoffs
QMJHL (1969–1981)
1969–1970 Lost to Verdun Maple Leafs 4 games to 2 in quarter-finals.
1970–1971 Out of playoffs.
1971–1972 Defeated Verdun Maple Leafs 8 points to 0 in quarter-finals. Defeated Shawinigan Bruins 8 points to 2 in semi-finals. Defeated Quebec Remparts 9 points to 5 in finals. QMJHL CHAMPIONS  Defeated Peterborough Petes 2-1 in Memorial Cup final. MEMORIAL CUP CHAMPIONS
1972–1973 Defeated Montreal Bleu-Blanc-Rouge 4 games to 0 in quarter-finals. Defeated Sorel Eperviers 4 games to 1 in semi-finals. Lost to Quebec Remparts 4 games to 3 in finals.
1973–1974 Lost to Laval National 4 games to 1 in quarter-finals.
1974–1975 Lost to Montreal Bleu-Blanc-Rouge 4 games to 0 in quarter-finals.
1975–1976 Defeated Montreal Juniors 4 games to 2 in quarter-finals. Lost to Quebec Remparts 4 games to 0 in semi-finals.
1976–1977 Defeated Trois-Rivières Draveurs 8 points to 4 in quarter-finals. Lost to Sherbrooke Castors 9 points to 0 in semi-finals.
1977–1978 Defeated Hull Olympiques 8 points to 0 in quarter-finals. Lost to Montreal Juniors 8 points to 2 in semi-finals.
1978–1979 Lost to Verdun Eperviers 8 points to 6 in quarter-finals.
1979–1980 Defeated in Shawinigan Cataractes 4 games to 3 in quarter-finals. Defeated Chicoutimi Saguenéens 4 games to 1 in semi-finals. Defeated Sherbrooke Castors 4 games to 2 in finals. QMJHL CHAMPIONS  Defeated Peterborough Petes 3-2 in Memorial Cup final. MEMORIAL CUP CHAMPIONS
1980–1981 Defeated Quebec Remparts 4 games to 3 in quarter-finals. Defeated Sherbrooke Castors 4 games to 3 in semi-finals. Defeated Trois-Rivières Draveurs 4 games to 1 in finals. QMJHL CHAMPIONS  Defeated Kitchener Rangers 5-2 in Memorial Cup final. MEMORIAL CUP CHAMPIONS

OHL (1981–1992)
1981–1982 Lost to Toronto Marlboros 6 points to 4 in first round.
1982–1983 Defeated Toronto Marlboros 7 points to 1 in first round. Lost to Ottawa 67's 8 points to 0 in quarter-finals.
1983–1984 Lost to Peterborough Petes 6 points to 0 in first round.
1984–1985 Defeated Toronto Marlboros 8 points to 2 in first round. Lost to Belleville Bulls 6 points to 2 in quarter-finals.
1985–1986 Lost to Belleville Bulls 9 points to 3 in first round.
1986–1987 Lost to Ottawa 67's 4 games to 1 in first round.
1987–1988 Defeated Belleville Bulls 4 games to 2 in first round. Lost to Ottawa 67's 4 games to 1 in quarter-finals.
1988–1989 Defeated Toronto Marlboros 4 games to 2 in first round. Defeated Ottawa 67's 4 games to 2 in quarter-finals. Lost to Peterborough Petes 4 games to 2 in semi-finals.
1989–1990 Lost to Oshawa Generals 4 games to 2 in first round.
1990–1991 Out of playoffs.
1991–1992 Lost to Ottawa 67's 4 games to 2 in first round.

Arenas
The Cornwall Royals played out of the Water Street Arena from 1969 to 1976, while in the QMJHL. The Arena, renamed in honour of Si Miller, the city's Director of Parks and Recreation for more than 30 years, was torn down in 2012.

From 1976 to 1992, the Royals played out for the Cornwall Civic Complex, located across the road from their previous arena. The arena hosted the 1990 Chrysler Challenge Cup, the annual All-Star game between the OHL and the QMJHL, which the OHL won by a score of 3 to 0.

References

 
1969 establishments in Ontario
1992 disestablishments in Ontario
Defunct Quebec Major Junior Hockey League teams
Defunct Ontario Hockey League teams
Ice hockey clubs established in 1969
Sports clubs disestablished in 1992